Feathers is an Australian band from Brisbane, Queensland consisting of Michelle Brown, Helena Papageorgiou, Innez Tulloch and Susan Milanovic.  They create dark reverb laden psychedelic dream pop with a 1960s garage edge.

History
Starting out with Brown and Papageorgiou in 2006, Feathers has seen its line up changes and music evolve. In late 2009, they were joined by Tulloch and Milanovic after previous drummer Andrea moved to Melbourne and began Chrome Dome.

Feathers have played shows with international acts such as Vivian Girls, Best Coast, Dead Meadow, Brian Chase & Seth Misterka and Earthless, and Australian bands such as Witch Hats, Stabs, Fabulous Diamonds, Deaf Wish, Blank Realm, Slug Guts.

Feathers released Hunter's Moon October 2011 through label Bon Voyage. This was classified as their first official with the current lineup, with one previous CD EP being released in 2008.

Hunter's Moon received airplay through several Australian community radio stations including 4ZZZ Brisbane, where it came in at number 1 on the weekly top 20 new releases.

References 

Australian pop music groups
All-female bands
Musical groups from Brisbane
Musical groups established in 2006